Sar-e Pol District is a district of Sar-e Pol Province, Afghanistan. It contains the capital, Sar-e Pol. The estimated population in 2019 was 173,719.

See also
 Sar-e Pol Province
 Sar-e Pol city
 Districts of Afghanistan

References

Districts of Sar-e Pol Province